The Place des Célestins is a square located in the Célestins quarter, in the 2nd arrondissement of Lyon. The square was named after the religious of the Order of the Celestines which were installed from 1407 to 1778. Redevelopment in 1995 added an underground car park. This zone is served by the metro station Bellecour. It belongs to the zone classified as World Heritage Site by UNESCO.

History
Before 1307, the square was located on the lands owned by  the Knights Templar, who had a command post there.

After the Knights Templar's eviction, the Celestines installed a monastery which, despite some fires, remained for almost 400 years. Eventually demolished in 1778, it was replaced with the housing estate of the Celestines and a theater. In the second half of the 19th century, the plan of major architectural creations through Presqu'île provided for a track linking the rue Mercière and the Place Bellecour to the Place des Célestins. This project was finally cancelled. The square was redeveloped in 1994-1995, during which an underground parking lot was dug. Within the square, a kind of refracting telescope provides a kaleidoscope view of the car park below.

The square has had almost the same appearance since the eighteenth century. Its most notable monument is the Théâtre des Célestins, designed by Gaspard André, and inaugurated in 1877, then in 2005.

See also
 List of streets and squares in Lyon

References

External links

 Célestins demain
 Official site of the Théâtre des Célestins

2nd arrondissement of Lyon
Celestins
World Heritage Sites in France
Celestine Order